Borisovo is a rural locality (a selo) and the administrative center of Borisovsky Selsoviet, Zalesovsky District, Altai Krai, Russia. The population was 699 as of 2013. There are 10 streets.

Geography 
Borisovo is located 20 km southwest of Zalesovo (the district's administrative centre) by road. Nikolsky is the nearest rural locality.

References 

Rural localities in Zalesovsky District